The first season of the stop-motion television series Robot Chicken originally aired in the United States on Cartoon Network's late night programming block, Adult Swim. Season one officially began on February 20, 2005 on Adult Swim, with "Junk in the Trunk", and ended with "The Black Cherry" on July 18, 2005, with a total of twenty episodes.

Many of the episode names in this season ("Junk in the Trunk", "Nightmare Generator", etc.) were rejected titles previously considered for the show before settling with the current title.

The first season was released on the Season One DVD on March 28, 2006 in Region 1, September 29, 2008 in Region 2 and April 4, 2007 in Region 4.

Overview 
The first season of Robot Chicken includes many TV, movie, TV commercial, and pop culture parodies and non-sequitur blackouts, all acted out by dolls and action figures, including parodies like Rachael Leigh Cook smashing more than eggs in her latest This Is Your Brain on Drugs public service announcement, Walt Disney's severed head with its giant robotic spider-body attacking Cuba, the animals Noah left behind trying to survive the flood in their very own ark, America sending Harrison Ford and Aerosmith into space to take out a killer asteroid, the world's most diabolical supervillains getting stuck in traffic, the Teen Titans strengthening their roster by adding Beavis and Butt-head, a teenage girl getting a fashion makeover in "Pimp My Sister", icons from Star Trek and Tiger Beat alike uniting for canned sitcom laughs in "Two Kirks, a Khan and a Pizza Place", the last surviving member of 'N Sync, Joey Fatone, having to avenge his murdered bandmates in a deadly martial arts tournament in "Enter the Fat One", the Masters of the Universe being rocked by a Paris Hilton-style sex tape, William Shatner's toupee having adventures the action star can only dream of, a man in a public restroom encountering the terror known as "Dumplestiltskin", the world's most famous monkey bursting loose on Skull Island in "Ding Dong, King Kong", Sailor Moon encountering a bone-chilling villain, Mary-Kate and Ashley Olsen uniting to fight a rampaging dragon, JAWS getting a special edition DVD, a man running away from an Oriental masseuse looking for a "happy ending", Alien vs. Predator on the battleground of love in a special episode of "First Date", a crime-fighting monkey saving monkeys from a monkey supervillain, and the laughter being canned for the sketch comedy show "You Can't Do That on Robot Chicken".

Guest stars 
Many celebrities have guest starred in Robot Chicken season one. They include Sarah Michelle Gellar, Mila Kunis, Joey Fatone, Rachael Leigh Cook, Scarlett Johansson, Conan O'Brien, Ryan Seacrest, Mark Hamill, Christian Slater, Phyllis Diller, Macaulay Culkin, Jamie Kaler, Abraham Benrubi, Donald Faison, Dax Shepard, Kurtwood Smith, Matthew Lillard, Danny Masterson, Ashton Kutcher, Debra Jo Rupp, Topher Grace, Burt Reynolds, Wilmer Valderrama, Dom DeLuise, Mike Henry, Erika Christensen, Rory Thost, Alex Borstein, Lance Bass, Pat Morita, Phil LaMarr, Ginnifer Goodwin, Ming-Na, Amy Smart, Freddie Prinze Jr., Don Knotts, Dave Coulier, Melissa Joan Hart, Linda Cardellini, Kelly Hu, Stuart Townsend, Scott Adsit, Dean Cain, Jon Heder and Efren Ramirez.

Episodes

DVD release

References 

2005 American television seasons
Robot Chicken seasons